Els Sterckx (born Herentals, 31 January 1972) is a Belgian-Flemish politician of the Vlaams Belang party and a member of the Flemish Parliament.

Stereckx served in the Belgian army before training as an ambulance driver with the Royal School Medical Service. She has been a councilor in Wuytsbergen and is the group leader for Vlaams Belang in Herentals municipal council. She has been a member of the Flemish Parliament since 2019, representing the Antwerp region. In the Flemish Parliament, she focuses on matters related to animal welfare.

References 

Living people
Vlaams Belang politicians
Flemish politicians
Members of the Flemish Parliament
1972 births